The 2009 Chunichi Dragons season resulted in an 81-62-1 record and qualification for the 2009 Central League Climax Series. The team was eliminated in the 2nd stage of the playoffs by the Yomiuri Giants. The season started poorly due to the departure of longtime star pitcher Kenshin Kawakami; as the season progressed, the Dragons' pitching improved, led by Taiwanese pitcher Chen Wei-Yin, Kazuki Yoshimi, Kenta Asakura, and left-handed Yudai Kawai, who won eleven games as starting pitcher, including a streak of eight games in a row, before taking his first loss of the season on August 6. Chen had the lowest Earned Run Average of any pitcher in four decades in Japan (1.54) despite having a relatively poor 8-4 starting record.   

Offensively, the Dragons had only two batters with over 500 plate appearances hit over .300 for the season, but Dominican slugger Tony Blanco was a surprising success.  Despite striking out far and away the most times of anybody on the team (157 K), he hit 39 home runs and made 110 runs while batting .275. Batters Masahiko Morino and Kazuhiro Wada, hit respectively 23 and 29 home runs.

Chunichi finished second in the Central League in the regular season with an 82-61-1 record, and qualified for the 2009 Central League Climax Series. In the first round of the playoffs, they closely defeated the Yakult Swallows 2-1, but were eliminated in the second stage by eventual 2009 Japan Series champions the Yomiuri Giants.

Regular season

Standings

Game log

|-  style="text-align:center; background:#bfb;"
| 1 || April 3 || BayStars || 4 - 1 || Asao (1-0) || Miura (0-1) || Iwase (1) || 37,678 || 1-0-0
|-  style="text-align:center; background:#bfb;"
| 2 || April 4 || BayStars || 6 - 0 || Yoshimi (1-0) || Glynn (0-1) ||  || 36,528 || 2-0-0
|-  style="text-align:center; background:#bfb;"
| 3 || April 5 || BayStars || 6 - 0 || Chen (1-0) || Kobayashi (0-1) ||  || 33,496 || 3-0-0
|-  style="text-align:center; background:#bfb;"
| 4 || April 7 || @Swallows || 3 - 4 || Takahashi (1-0) || Oshimoto (0-1) || Iwase (2) || 17,538 || 4-0-0
|-  style="text-align:center; background:#fbb;"
| 5 || April 8 || @Swallows || 8 - 4 || Kida (1-0) || Nakata (0-1) ||  || 15,089 || 4-1-0
|-  style="text-align:center; background:#fbb;"
| 6 || April 9 || @Swallows || 10 - 7 || Ishikawa (1-1) || Asao (1-1) || Lim (2) || 14,526 || 4-2-0
|-  style="text-align:center; background:#bfb;"
| 7 || April 10 || @Carp || 3 - 11 || Yoshimi (2-0) || Lewis (1-1) || Nelson (1) || 30,618 || 5-2-0
|-  style="text-align:center; background:#fbb;"
| 8 || April 11 || @Carp || 2 - 0 || Maeda (2-0) || Shimizu (0-1) ||  || 30,268 || 5-3-0
|-  style="text-align:center; background:#fbb;"
| 9 || April 12 || @Carp || 10 - 0 || Shinoda (1-0) || Yamamoto (0-1) ||  || 30,139 || 5-4-0
|-  style="text-align:center; background:#bbb;"
| — || April 14 || @Tigers || colspan=6|Postponed (rained out)
|-  style="text-align:center; background:#bfb;"
| 10 || April 15 || @Tigers || 2 - 9 || Asakura (1-0) || Shimoyanagi (1-1) ||  || 40,476 || 6-4-0
|-  style="text-align:center; background:#fbb;"
| 11 || April 16 || @Tigers || 4 - 3 || Atchison (1-0) || Asao (1-2) || Fujikawa (2) || 40,195 || 6-5-0
|-  style="text-align:center; background:#fbb;"
| 12 || April 17 || Giants || 3 - 5 || Tono (2-0) || Yoshimi (2-1) || Kroon (3) || 35,669 || 6-6-0
|-  style="text-align:center; background:#fbb;"
| 13 || April 18 || Giants || 2 - 3 || Yamaguchi (1-0) || Chen (1-1) || Kroon (4) || 37,883 || 6-7-0
|-  style="text-align:center; background:#fbb;"
| 14 || April 19 || Giants || 5 - 6 || Nishimura (1-0) || Nelson (0-1) || Kroon (5) || 37,815 || 6-8-0
|-  style="text-align:center; background:#bfb;"
| 15 || April 21 || Tigers || 2 - 1 || Asakura (2-0) || Shimoyanagi (1-2) || Iwase (3) || 30,434 || 7-8-0
|-  style="text-align:center; background:#bfb;"
| 16 || April 22 || Tigers || 6 - 2 || Asao (2-2) || Kubota (0-1) || Iwase (4) || 31,650 || 8-8-0
|-  style="text-align:center; background:#fbb;"
| 17 || April 23 || Tigers || 1 - 4 (12) || Fujikawa (1-0) || Nelson (0-2) ||  || 30,850 || 8-9-0
|-  style="text-align:center; background:#bfb;"
| 18 || April 24 || @Giants || 2 - 3 (10) || Kobayashi (1-0) || Ochi (2-1) || Iwase (5) || 42,262 || 9-9-0
|-  style="text-align:center; background:#fbb;"
| 19 || April 25 || @Giants || 5 - 4 || Toyoda (1-0) || Iwase (0-1) ||  || 43,707 || 9-10-0
|-  style="text-align:center; background:#bfb;"
| 20 || April 26 || @Giants || 0 - 8 || Kawai (1-0) || Greisinger (3-2) ||  || 43,020 || 10-10-0
|-  style="text-align:center; background:#fbb;"
| 21 || April 28 || Swallows || 2 - 4 || Kida (2-2) || Asakura (2-1) || Lim (5) || 12,115 || 10-11-0
|-  style="text-align:center; background:#fbb;"
| 22 || April 29 || Swallows || 1 - 7 || Tateyama (2-0) || Asao (2-3) ||  || 33,318 || 10-12-0
|-  style="text-align:center; background:#fbb;"
| 23 || April 30 || Swallows || 0 - 3 || Ishikawa (3-1) || Yoshimi (2-2) || Lim (6) || 29,184 || 10-13-0
|-

|-  style="text-align:center; background:#fbb;"
| 24 || May 2 || @BayStars || 6 - 1 || Miura (3-2) || Yamai (0-1) ||  || 21,080 || 10-14-0
|-  style="text-align:center; background:#bfb;"
| 25 || May 3 || @BayStars || 0 - 2 || Chen (2-1) || Glynn (1-4) ||  || 23,920 || 11-14-0
|-  style="text-align:center; background:#bfb;"
| 26 || May 4 || @BayStars ||  2 - 4  || Saito (1-0)  || Ishii (0-3)  || Hirai (1) || 22,529 || 12-14-0
|-  style="text-align:center; background:#fbb;"
| 27 || May 5 || Carp || 0 - 2 || Otake (2-1) || Asakura (2-2) || Nagakawa (9) || 37,494 || 12-15-0
|-  style="text-align:center; background:#bfb;"
| 28 || May 6 || Carp || 4 - 2 || Asao (3-3) || Saito (2-2) || Iwase (6) || 36,159 || 13-15-0
|-  style="text-align:center; background:#bfb;"
| 29 || May 7 || Carp || 4 - 3 || Saito (2-0) || Umetsu (2-1) ||  || 26,978 || 14-15-0
|-  style="text-align:center; background:#fbb;"
| 30 || May 8 || @Giants || 10 - 4 || Greisinger (4-2) || Yamai (0-2) ||  || 42,927 || 14-16-0
|-  style="text-align:center; background:#fbb;"
| 31 || May 9 || @Giants || 3 - 1 || Gonzalez (2-0) || Chen (2-2) || Ochi (3) || 42,047 || 14-17-0
|-  style="text-align:center; background:#fbb;"
| 32 || May 10 || @Giants || 8 - 7 || Nakamura (1-1) || Saito (2-1) || Ochi (4) || 43,185 || 14-18-0
|-  style="text-align:center; background:#bfb;"
| 33 || May 12 || Swallows || 6 - 3 || Asakura (3-2) || Ichiba (1-3) || Iwase (7) || 9,059 || 15-18-0
|-  style="text-align:center; background:#fbb;"
| 34 || May 13 || Swallows || 1 - 7 || Ishikawa (5-1) || Asao (3-4) ||  || 26,258 || 15-19-0
|-  style="text-align:center; background:#fbb;"
| 35 || May 14 || Swallows || 5 - 8 || Matsuoka (1-0) || Ogasawara (0-1) || Lim (11) || 25,010 || 15-20-0
|-  style="text-align:center; background:#bfb;"
| 36 || May 15 || BayStars || 1 - 0 (10) || Yoshimi (3-2) || Ishii (0-4) ||  || 27,711 || 16-20-0
|-  style="text-align:center; background:#bfb;"
| 37 || May 16 || BayStars || 2 - 1 (10) || Iwase (1-1) || Yamaguchi (3-2) ||  || 32,869 || 17-20-0
|-  style="text-align:center; background:#bfb;"
| 38 || May 17 || BayStars || 4 - 1 || Kawai (2-0) || Kobayashi (1-3) || Iwase (8) || 33,935 || 18-20-0
|-  style="text-align:center; background:#bfb;"
| 39 || May 19 || @Lions || 5 - 7 || Asakura (4-2) || Onuma (1-3) || Iwase (9) || 18,110 || 19-20-0
|-  style="text-align:center; background:#fbb;"
| 40 || May 20 || @Lions || 2 - 1 (10) || Nogami (1-2) || Asao (3-5) ||  || 19,203 || 19-21-0
|-  style="text-align:center; background:#bfb;"
| 41 || May 22 || @Marines || 1 - 4 || Yoshimi (4-2) || Omine (2-2) || Iwase (10) || 14,660 || 20-21-0
|-  style="text-align:center; background:#fbb;"
| 42 || May 23 || @Marines || 2 - 1 || Sikorski (3-2) || Hirai (0-1) ||  || 28,117 || 20-22-0
|-  style="text-align:center; background:#bfb;"
| 43 || May 24 || Fighters || 1 - 0 || Kawai (3-0) || Takeda (2-3) || Iwase (11) || 31,711 || 21-22-0
|-  style="text-align:center; background:#bfb;"
| 44 || May 25 || Fighters || 10 - 4 || Asakura (5-2) || Itokazu (0-1) ||  || 29,051 || 22-22-0
|-  style="text-align:center; background:#fbb;"
| 45 || May 27 || Eagles || 2 - 3 || Tanaka (7-0) || Takahashi (1-1) || Aoyama (2) || 32,208 || 22-23-0
|-  style="text-align:center; background:#bfb;"
| 46 || May 28 || Eagles || 2 - 1 (10) || Nagamine (1-0) || Aoyama (0-2) ||  || 28,262 || 23-23-0
|-  style="text-align:center; background:#fbb;"
| 47 || May 30 || @Hawks || 9 - 5 || Satō (1-0) || Nagamine (1-1) ||  || 30,387 || 23-24-0
|-  style="text-align:center; background:#fbb;"
| 48 || May 31 || @Hawks || 5 - 4 || Falkenborg (3-0) || Takahashi (1-2) ||  || 33,231 || 23-25-0
|-

|-
| 49 || June 2 || @Buffaloes ||  ||  ||  ||  ||  || 
|-
| 50 || June 3 || @Buffaloes ||  ||  ||  ||  ||  || 
|-
| 51 || June 5 || Marines ||  ||  ||  ||  ||  || 
|-
| 52 || June 6 || Marines ||  ||  ||  ||  ||  || 
|-
| 53 || June 7 || Lions ||  ||  ||  ||  ||  || 
|-
| 54 || June 8 || Lions ||  ||  ||  ||  ||  || 
|-
| 55 || June 10 || @Eagles ||  ||  ||  ||  ||  || 
|-
| 56 || June 11 || @Eagles ||  ||  ||  ||  ||  || 
|-
| 57 || June 13 || @Fighters ||  ||  ||  ||  ||  || 
|-
| 58 || June 14 || @Fighters ||  ||  ||  ||  ||  || 
|-
| 59 || June 16 || Hawks ||  ||  ||  ||  ||  || 
|-
| 60 || June 17 || Hawks ||  ||  ||  ||  ||  || 
|-
| 61 || June 20 || Buffaloes ||  ||  ||  ||  ||  || 
|-
| 62 || June 21 || Buffaloes ||  ||  ||  ||  ||  || 
|-
| 63 || June 26 || @Carp ||  ||  ||  ||  ||  || 
|-
| 64 || June 27 || @Carp ||  ||  ||  ||  ||  || 
|-
| 65 || June 28 || @Carp ||  ||  ||  ||  ||  || 
|-
| 66 || June 30 || Tigers ||  ||  ||  ||  ||  || 
|-

|-
| 67 || July 1 || Tigers ||  ||  ||  ||  ||  || 
|-
| 68 || July 2 || Tigers ||  ||  ||  ||  ||  || 
|-
| 69 || July 3 || Giants ||  ||  ||  ||  ||  || 
|-
| 70 || July 4 || Giants ||  ||  ||  ||  ||  || 
|-
| 71 || July 5 || Giants ||  ||  ||  ||  ||  || 
|-
| 72 || July 7 || @Swallows ||  ||  ||  ||  ||  || 
|-
| 73 || July 8 || @Swallows ||  ||  ||  ||  ||  || 
|-
| 74 || July 9 || @Swallows ||  ||  ||  ||  ||  || 
|-
| 75 || July 10 || Carp ||  ||  ||  ||  ||  || 
|-
| 76 || July 11 || Carp ||  ||  ||  ||  ||  || 
|-
| 77 || July 12 || Carp ||  ||  ||  ||  ||  || 
|-
| 78 || July 14 || @Tigers ||  ||  ||  ||  ||  || 
|-
| 79 || July 15 || @Tigers ||  ||  ||  ||  ||  || 
|-
| 80 || July 16 || @Tigers ||  ||  ||  ||  ||  || 
|-
| 81 || July 17 || @BayStars ||  ||  ||  ||  ||  || 
|-
| 82 || July 18 || @BayStars ||  ||  ||  ||  ||  || 
|-
| 83 || July 19 || @BayStars ||  ||  ||  ||  ||  || 
|-
| 84 || July 20 || Carp ||  ||  ||  ||  ||  || 
|-
| 85 || July 21 || Carp ||  ||  ||  ||  ||  || 
|-
| 86 || July 22 || Carp ||  ||  ||  ||  ||  || 
|-
| 87 || July 28 || @Giants ||  ||  ||  ||  ||  || 
|-
| 88 || July 29 || @Giants ||  ||  ||  ||  ||  || 
|-
| 89 || July 30 || @Giants ||  ||  ||  ||  ||  || 
|-
| 90 || July 31 || @Swallows ||  ||  ||  ||  ||  || 
|-

|-
| 91 || August 1 || @Swallows ||  ||  ||  ||  ||  || 
|-
| 92 || August 2 || @Swallows ||  ||  ||  ||  ||  || 
|-
| 93 || August 4 || Tigers ||  ||  ||  ||  ||  || 
|-
| 94 || August 5 || Tigers ||  ||  ||  ||  ||  || 
|-
| 95 || August 6 || Tigers ||  ||  ||  ||  ||  || 
|-
| 96 || August 7 || @BayStars ||  ||  ||  ||  ||  || 
|-
| 97 || August 8 || @BayStars ||  ||  ||  ||  ||  || 
|-
| 98 || August 9 || @BayStars ||  ||  ||  ||  ||  || 
|-
| 99 || August 11 || @Tigers ||  ||  ||  ||  ||  || 
|-
| 100 || August 12 || @Tigers ||  ||  ||  ||  ||  || 
|-
| 101 || August 13 || @Tigers ||  ||  ||  ||  ||  || 
|-
| 102 || August 14 || Swallows ||  ||  ||  ||  ||  || 
|-
| 103 || August 15 || Swallows ||  ||  ||  ||  ||  || 
|-
| 104 || August 16 || Swallows ||  ||  ||  ||  ||  || 
|-
| 105 || August 18 || @Carp ||  ||  ||  ||  ||  || 
|-
| 106 || August 19 || @Carp ||  ||  ||  ||  ||  || 
|-
| 107 || August 20 || @Carp ||  ||  ||  ||  ||  || 
|-
| 108 || August 21 || BayStars ||  ||  ||  ||  ||  || 
|-
| 109 || August 22 || BayStars ||  ||  ||  ||  ||  || 
|-
| 110 || August 23 || BayStars ||  ||  ||  ||  ||  || 
|-
| 111 || August 25 || Giants ||  ||  ||  ||  ||  || 
|-
| 112 || August 26 || Giants ||  ||  ||  ||  ||  || 
|-
| 113 || August 27 || Giants ||  ||  ||  ||  ||  || 
|-
| 114 || August 28 || @Swallows ||  ||  ||  ||  ||  || 
|-
| 115 || August 29 || @Swallows ||  ||  ||  ||  ||  || 
|-
| 116 || August 30 || @Swallows ||  ||  ||  ||  ||  || 
|-

|-
| 117 || September 1 || Carp ||  ||  ||  ||  ||  || 
|-
| 118 || September 2 || Carp ||  ||  ||  ||  ||  || 
|-
| 119 || September 3 || Carp ||  ||  ||  ||  ||  || 
|-
| 120 || September 5 || @BayStars ||  ||  ||  ||  ||  || 
|-
| 121 || September 6 || @BayStars ||  ||  ||  ||  ||  || 
|-
| 122 || September 8 || @Tigers ||  ||  ||  ||  ||  || 
|-
| 123 || September 9 || @Tigers ||  ||  ||  ||  ||  || 
|-
| 124 || September 10 || @Tigers ||  ||  ||  ||  ||  || 
|-
| 125 || September 11 || Swallows ||  ||  ||  ||  ||  || 
|-
| 126 || September 12 || Swallows ||  ||  ||  ||  ||  || 
|-
| 127 || September 13 || Swallows ||  ||  ||  ||  ||  || 
|-
| 128 || September 15 || @Carp ||  ||  ||  ||  ||  || 
|-
| 129 || September 16 || @Carp ||  ||  ||  ||  ||  || 
|-
| 130 || September 17 || @Carp ||  ||  ||  ||  ||  || 
|-
| 131 || September 18 || BayStars ||  ||  ||  ||  ||  || 
|-
| 132 || September 19 || BayStars ||  ||  ||  ||  ||  || 
|-
| 133 || September 20 || BayStars ||  ||  ||  ||  ||  || 
|-
| 134 || September 21 || @Giants ||  ||  ||  ||  ||  || 
|-
| 135 || September 22 || @Giants ||  ||  ||  ||  ||  || 
|-
| 136 || September 23 || @Giants ||  ||  ||  ||  ||  || 
|-
| 137 || September 25 || Tigers ||  ||  ||  ||  ||  || 
|-
| 138 || September 26 || Tigers ||  ||  ||  ||  ||  || 
|-
| 139 || September 27 || Tigers ||  ||  ||  ||  ||  || 
|-
| 140 || September 28 || Giants ||  ||  ||  ||  ||  || 
|-
| 141 || September 29 || Giants ||  ||  ||  ||  ||  || 
|-
| 142 || September 30 || Giants ||  ||  ||  ||  ||  || 
|-

Player stats

Batting

Pitching

References

Chunichi Dragons
Chunichi Dragons seasons